Benjamin Clapp (born October 13, 1977) is an American musician from Boise, Idaho. He has performed, composed, and recorded music with numerous artists, most notably Erik Sanko (The Lounge Lizards) and Skeleton Key, Tom Marshall (Phish) and Amfibian, Anthony Krizan (Spin Doctors), Jim Breuer, Kronos Quartet, Jesse Blaze Snider and Baptized By Fire, Dee Snider (Twisted Sister), Billy Martin (Medeski Martin and Wood), David Peel (The Lower East Side), and White Trash.

Early life and education
At the age of eleven, Clapp began studying trombone in Idaho public schools. He studied privately under bass trombonist Mark Sellman for a number of years, and was awarded the Louis Armstrong Award in 1995, as well as performance awards at Boise State University and the Lionel Hampton International Jazz Festival. Meanwhile, he was self-learning to play drums; influenced early on by drummers Stewart Copeland, Lars Ulrich, and Dale Crover.

Career

1993-2000
In 1993, Clapp joined Boise punk band, Haggis, following ex-Septic Death drummer Paul Birnbaum's departure from the band. The band went on to tour the West Coast, and release a number of singles and compilation tracks internationally, including the vinyl only 1995 release Step Into It, on German record label, Bilharziose. Through the next several years, Clapp was involved with a number of independent music projects in Boise, and went on to collaborate again with members of Haggis - this time with inclusion of Birnbaum. Clapp was a founding member of the Adversives and the Mosquitones, and performed on all of their recorded releases and national tours.

Clapp formed independent record label Spudtown Records in 1995, and released the vinyl only compilation 12 Songs You Won't Like By 12 Bands You've Never Heard of From Boise, Idaho. The label continued working with regional bands to release their EPs and albums under the moniker STMC (Spudtown Music Collective) until Clapp relocated to the East Coast.

2001-present
In early 2001, Clapp moved to New York City, and within months was hired on as drummer for a Warsaw Poland Brothers US tour, performing for the first time with the band in New Orleans with no audition or rehearsal. Later the same year he moved to New Jersey and became active in the music scene fostered by legendary promoter/performer Jack Monahan, at the Brighton Bar. He was invited to join the Do Dads, who would then go on to 3 Asbury Park Music Award nominations.

By recommendation from rock photographer Mark Weiss to Twisted Sister frontman Dee Snider, Clapp was introduced to Snider's eldest son Jesse Blaze Snider in 2004, and they went on to perform together as Blazed, and from 2006 to 2008 as Baptized By Fire. Clapp also joined Erik Sanko's band Skeleton Key in 2004 as their "junk percussionist", and became further recognized for his use of non-traditional percussion: "...the real dirty work's done by brutish showman Benjamin Clapp.  He chucks broken cymbals up into the air and slugs them on their way down.  He has the worlds [sic] most dangerous tambourine:   A rectangular frame, I'm guessing 36" x 24", with CIRCULAR SAW BLADES strung on it." Skeleton Key continued to tour the United States and Canada with Clapp in the band, and recorded songs which would eventually go on to limited release as The Lyons Quintette EP.

Among a number of studio projects and touring artists that hire Clapp to perform on stage and in the studio, Phish lyricist Tom Marshall and his band Amfibian feature Clapp's trombone playing on their studio albums From the Ether and Skip the Goodbyes. Clapp's trombone playing is also a fixture in the current line-up for Elektra Records recording artists: White Trash, and is heard on their 2009 release 3-D Monkeys In Space.

Discography
1994 - Bitter (with Haggis) credit: drums
1994 - Encyclopedia of Post Punk Hits (with Haggis) credit: drums
1995 - 20 Bands Trash 20 Songs to Find The Way to Sesame Street v/a compilation (with Haggis) credit: drums
1995 - Toiletbowl Epiphonies (with The Mosquitones) credit: trombone
1995 - Wade Free Wherever v/a compilation (with Haggis) credit: drums
1995 - Step Into It (with Haggis) credit: drums
1995 - Drunk and Disorderly (with Haggis) credit: drums
1995 - 12 Songs You Won't Like by 12 Bands You've Never Heard Of v/a compilation (with Haggis) credit: drums
1995 - 12 Songs You Won't Like by 12 Bands You've Never Heard Of v/a compilation (with the Adversives) credit: vocals, guitar
1996 - The Search For Roger Ferris (with Adversives) credit: vocals, guitar
1996 - The Dread/The Adversives Split 10" (with the Adversives) credit: vocals, guitar
1996 - Wood Panel Pacer Wagon With Mags v/a compilation (with Haggis) credit: drums
1997 - Liverache: Tales From the Liver's Edge v/a compilation (with Haggis) credit: drums
1997 - Cause/The Adversives Split 7" (with the Adversives) credit: vocals, guitar
1997 - Making Human Junk v/a compilation (with the Adversives) credit: vocals, guitar
1997 - Mosquitones (with Mosquitones) credit: trombone
1998 - Coolidge 50 v/a compilation (with Haggis) credit: drums
1999 - Smile Upon The Children (with Diseased Media Society) credit: trombone
1999 - Dance of the Dishwasher (with Los Mosquitones) credit: trombone
1999 - Shotgun Response - Alliance In Defiance/The Adversives (with the Adversives) credit: vocals, guitar
2000 - Adversives (with the Adversives) credit: vocals, guitar
2001 - I Can't Sleep and I'm Never Awake (with The Unit Breed) credit: drums
2001 - Boise, Idaho v/a compilation (with Mosquitones) credit: drums
2004 - Live 1997-2003 (with Warsaw Poland Brothers) credit: drums
2004 - From the Ether (with Amfibian) credit: trombone
2004 - Highland at Euclid (with Mosquitones) credit: drums
2004 - Live at the Metro (with Skeleton Key) credit: trombone, junk percussion
2005 - Mermaid Parade (with the DoDads) credit: trombone
2005 - Now The Party Starts (with Blazed) credit: drums
2005 - The Lyons Quintette EP (with Skeleton Key) credit: trombone, junk percussion
2006 - Butterbrain (with Butterbrain) credit: trombone
2006 - Best of Ska and Rocksteady (with Warsaw Poland Brothers) credit: drums
2006 - Juggernaut EP (with Baptized By Fire) credit: drums
2007 - Flesheaters v/a compilation (with Baptized By Fire) credit: drums
2007 - Eclectric (with Sunny Daze) credit: trombone
2007 - Skip The Goodbyes (with Amfibian) credit: trombone
2007 - First To Fight (with Warsaw Poland Brothers) credit: drums
2008 - Code Red (with J-Henry) credit: trombone
2009 - Jayder (with Jayder) credit: drums
2009 - 3D Monkeys In Space (with White Trash) credit: trombone
2009 - Tales From Dirty Jersey (with Barry and the Penetrators) credit: trombone
2009 - The Long Evening (with Keith Monacchio) credit: trombone
2010 - Tropism (with Jesse Urmey) credit: trombone
2010 - Speak Softly and Carry a Big Stick (Vol. 1) (with Steve Honoshowsky) credit: drums
2012 - Gravity is the Enemy (with Skeleton Key) credit: trombone, junk percussion
2012 - Full Fathom 5 (with Tony Todesco & Full Fathom 5) credit: trombone
2015 - Suburban Purgatory (with White Trash) credit: trombone
2015 - Together at Last (with The Shady Street Show Band and Hot Blood) credit: trombone
2018 - The In Part of the Out Crowd (with Acid) credit: drums
2019 - Butterbrain - The EP (with Butterbrain) credit: trombone
2020 - West Coast vs. East Coast: Public Serpents/Upper Downer split (with Public Serpents) credit: trombone
2020 - Public Serpents / Escape From The Zoo split (with Public Serpents) credit: trombone
2021 - Glamdemic! (with Space Panther) credit: drums

References

External links
Ben Clapp's official website
 

American male composers
20th-century American composers
American rock drummers
1977 births
Living people
Musicians from Boise, Idaho
20th-century American drummers
American male drummers
21st-century American drummers
20th-century American male musicians
21st-century American male musicians